Nicole Stelle Garnett (born January 7, 1970) is the John P. Murphy Foundation Professor of Law at Notre Dame Law School, teaching in the areas of property, land use, urban development, local government law, and education.  She has written numerous articles on these subjects that have appeared in a variety of journals, including the Michigan Law Review, the Stanford Law Review, and the Yale Law Journal.  Additionally, she wrote Ordering the City: Land Use, Policing and the Restoration of Urban America, published by Yale University Press in 2009.

Education and experience

Garnett majored in political science and graduated Phi Beta Kappa from Stanford University.  She earned her J.D. from Yale Law School in 1995, then clerked for Judge Morris Sheppard Arnold on the U.S. Court of Appeals for the Eighth Circuit.  She practiced at the Institute for Justice for two years before clerking for Justice Clarence Thomas on the United States Supreme Court during the 1998-1999 Term.

In 1999, she joined the faculty at University of Notre Dame. In Spring term 2007, she was a visiting faculty member at the University of Chicago Law School. In 2009, Garnett received the Paul M. Bator Award, given annually by the Federalist Society for Law and Policy Studies to an academic under 40 for excellence in teaching, scholarship, and commitment to students. In 2014, she co-authored a study on Catholic education and urban conditions, "Lost Classroom, Lost Community: Catholic Schools' Importance in Urban America." In the book, she argued the presence of Catholic schools strengthens the community. In 2016, she received the Reinhold Neibuhr Award from the University of Notre Dame for scholarship advancing social justice.

Personal life
She is married to Richard W. Garnett, who is Paul J. Schierl/Fort Howard Corporation Professor of Law at the University of Notre Dame.

See also
 List of law clerks of the Supreme Court of the United States (Seat 10)

Notes

External links
Nicole Stelle Garnett faculty page
Nicole Stelle Garnett's Social Science Research Network articles page
Ordering the City: Land Use, Policing and the Restoration of Urban America, 

1970 births
Living people
Stanford University alumni
Yale Law School alumni
American legal scholars
American legal writers
American women academics
Lawyers from Washington, D.C.
University of Notre Dame faculty
Notre Dame Law School faculty
Law clerks of the Supreme Court of the United States
21st-century American women